Harris Farm is a historic farm property at 2950 Thomas Jefferson Highway (Virginia State Route 53), in rural eastern Albemarle County, Virginia. The centerpiece of the farm complex is a farmhouse whose oldest portion is a Greek Revival I-house built about 1850 by Robert Gentry. In 1898 the house was sold to Hilton Ashby Harris, who increased the house's size by building a second I-house directly attached to the front of the first. A cross-gabled rear projecting ell was added at some time in the early 20th century. The house represents a creative adaptation of traditional housing forms, as well as exemplifying changing construction techniques associated with those forms.

The farm property was added to the National Register of Historic Places in 2015.

See also
National Register of Historic Places listings in Albemarle County, Virginia

References

Houses on the National Register of Historic Places in Virginia
Greek Revival houses in Virginia
Houses completed in 1850
Houses in Albemarle County, Virginia
National Register of Historic Places in Albemarle County, Virginia